The American Jewish Historical Society (AJHS) was founded in 1892 with the mission to foster awareness and appreciation of American Jewish history and to serve as a national scholarly resource for research through the collection, preservation and dissemination of materials relating to American Jewish history.

History 

The American Jewish Historical Society is the oldest national ethnic historical organization in the United States. The Society's library, archives, photograph, and art and artifacts collections document the American Jewish experience. They are housed in the Center for Jewish History in Manhattan.

The society has administrative offices in both New York, New York, and in Boston, Massachusetts. It has served as a public educational and interpretive function by publishing a journal, a newsletter, monographs and reference works on the American Jewish experience.

In 2007, it was among over 530 New York City arts and social service institutions to receive part of a $20 million grant from the Carnegie Corporation, which was made possible through a donation by New York City mayor Michael Bloomberg.

Past Presidents 

 1892–1898: Oscar S. Straus
 1899–1921: Cyrus Adler
 1921–1948: A.S.W. Rosenbach
 1948–1952: Lee M. Friedman
 1952–1954: Salo W. Baron
 1954–1955: David de Sola Pool
 1955–1958: Jacob Rader Marcus
 1958–1961: Bertram Korn
 1961–1964: Abram Kanof, MD
 1964–1967: Leon J. Obermayer
 1967–1969: Philip D. Sang
 1969–1972: Abram Vossen Goodman
 1972–1975: Abraham J. Karp
 1975–1976: Maurice Jacobs
 1976–1979: David R. Pokross
 1979–1982: Saul Viener
 1982–1985: Ruth B. Fein
 1985–1988: Morris Soble
 1988–1990: Phil David Fine
 1990–1993: Ronald C. Curhan
 1993–1998: Justin Wyner
 1998–2003: Kenneth J. Bialkin
 2003–2007: Sidney Lapidus
 2007–2010: Daniel R. Kaplan
 2011–2014: Paul B. Warhit
 2014–2020: Bernard J. Michael
 2020-present: Felicia Herman

Publishing 
The Society publishes books, a genealogy program, museums tours, academic assistance and other related educational activities. Additionally, the American Jewish Historical Society publishes the following publications:
Heritage, a bi-yearly newsletter
 American Jewish History
 Jews in Sports Online

Collections 
The American Jewish Historical Society has some 40 million items in its archives, including manuscripts, printed material, photographs, audio files, film files, digital material, and objects. Important elements of the Society's collection include hundreds of historical manuscripts and other records of American Jewish groups, including the papers of the Council of Jewish Federations and Welfare Funds, the Synagogue Council of America, the American Jewish Congress, the American Jewish Committee, and the Hebrew Benevolent Society, as well as the papers of HIAS (formerly the Hebrew Immigrant Aid Society) from 1954 to 2000; United Jewish Appeal-Federation of New York and predecessor organizations from 1909 to 2004; and the American Soviet Jewry Movement.

The Society holds the original manuscript of "The New Colossus" by Emma Lazarus, as well as very early American Jewish documents, including Judah Monis's Hebrew grammar textbook (1735), the first American siddur for Jewish holidays printed in English (1761), and the first Hebrew‐English prayerbook published in the United States (1826). The Society also holds documents from American Jewish Patriots of the American Revolution, including the marriage contract of Haym Salomon (1777). The Society's Loeb Portrait Database of American Jewish Portraits is a repository of more than 400 portraits of pre-1865 American Jews.

The Society also maintains the Jewish-American Hall of Fame, which was founded in 1969 at the Judah L. Magnes Museum in Berkeley, California, and became part of the American Jewish Historical Society in 2001.

Exhibitions 
 2014: "October 7, 1944," multimedia exhibition created by choreographer Jonah Bokaer.

Online exhibitions & collections 
 Jewish Museum in Cyberspace
 Jewish-American Hall of Fame
 Jews in Sport Online

See also 
 Texas Jewish Historical Society

References

Further reading 
 Kaplan, Elisabeth. 2000. "We Are What We Collect, We Collect What We Are: Archives and the Construction of Identity." The American Archivist. 63, no. 1: 126–151.

External links 
 
 
 American Jewish Historical Society Records at the American Jewish Historical Society

1892 establishments in New York (state)
Jewish-American history
Jews and Judaism in Manhattan
Organizations established in 1892
Jewish studies research institutes
Jewish organizations
Archives in the United States
Jewish history organizations
Non-profit organizations based in New York City
Historical societies in New York City